Leonor Manso (born 16 April 1948) is an Argentinian actress. She appeared in more than 70 films since 1969. Manso directed her first production, Waiting for Godot, in 1996. She married and divorced fellow actors Antonio Grimau and Patricio Contreras.

Selected filmography

References

External links 

1948 births
Living people
Argentine film actresses